Lorenzo G. Villanueva, (born November 11, 1985) is a Filipino professional boxer in the Featherweight class. He is trained by famed trainer Freddie Roach.

Boxing career
Villanueva turned professional in 2007.

In 2009, Villanueva won the WBO Oriental featherweight title by stopping previously unbeaten Eric Canoy in the 10th round. 
 
His first fight in the United States was supposed to be on November 12, 2011 on the Manny Pacquiao vs. Juan Manuel Marquez III undercard against an undecided opponent, but visa issues prevented Villanueva from participating in the event.

On May 5, 2012, he suffered his first defeat, after being knocked-out in round 2 by Indonesian's Daud Yordan held at Marina Bay Sands, Singapore for the vacant International Boxing Organization Featherweight title.

References

External links

1985 births
Living people
Featherweight boxers
Southpaw boxers
Filipino male boxers
People from Cotabato